Donald John Cameron (20 February 1933 – 7 September 2016) was a New Zealand journalist and sportswriter. He was one of the leading New Zealand sportswriters of the 20th century.

Early life
Born in Dunedin, Cameron was educated at Christian Brothers' High School, Dunedin (1946), St Peter's College, Auckland (1946–47), St Patrick's High School, Timaru and St. Kevin's College, Oamaru (1948–49).

Career
He was sports reporter on the New Zealand Herald (1950-1998). He wrote several books on sport  "'D J Cameron' was the familiar by-line on sports stories that appeared in the New Zealand Herald over the period over 40 years that he was employed on that newspaper.

Death
Cameron died in Auckland on 7 September 2016.

Bibliography
 Caribbean Crusade: The New Zealand Cricketers in the West Indies 1972 (1972)
 Memorable Moments in New Zealand Sport (1979; editor) 
 All Blacks: Retreat From Glory (1980)
 Barbed Wire Boks (1981)
 Rugby Triumphant: The All Blacks in Australia and Wales (1981)
 Test Series '82: The Australian Cricket Tour of New Zealand (1982; with Dick Brittenden)
 On the Lions' Trail (1983)
 Someone Had to Do It: A Sports Journalist Remembers  (1998)
 The New Zealand Herald Matches of the Century: 100 years of great New Zealand rugby (1999)

References

External links
 National Library catalogue search for D J Cameron (Retrieved 24 January 2013).

1933 births
2016 deaths
New Zealand journalists
People educated at Trinity Catholic College, Dunedin
People educated at St Peter's College, Auckland
People educated at St Kevin's College, Oamaru
Writers from Auckland
Writers from Dunedin
New Zealand sportswriters
Cricket historians and writers
People educated at Roncalli College
New Zealand sports historians